The 2018–19 Wagner Seahawks men's basketball team represented Wagner College during the 2018–19 NCAA Division I men's basketball season. The Seahawks were led by seventh-year head coach Bashir Mason. They played their home games at Spiro Sports Center on the school's Staten Island campus as members of the Northeast Conference. They finished the season 13–17 overall, 8–10 in NEC play to finish in seventh place. As the No. 7 seed in the NEC tournament, they were defeated in the quarterfinals by the eventual tournament champion, Fairleigh Dickinson.

Previous season
The Seahawks finished the 2017–18 season, 23–10, 14–4 in NEC play to win the NEC regular season championship. In the NEC tournament, they defeated Central Connecticut and Robert Morris before losing to LIU Brooklyn in the championship game. As a regular season conference champion who did not win their conference tournament, they received an invitation to the National Invitation Tournament, where they lost in the first round to Baylor.

Roster

Schedule and results

|-
!colspan=12 style=| Non-Conference Regular season

|-
!colspan=12 style=| NEC regular season

|-
!colspan=12 style=| NEC tournament
|-

|-

Source

References

Wagner Seahawks men's basketball seasons
Wagner Seahawks
Wagner Seahawks men's basketball team
Wagner Seahawks men's basketball team